L32 may refer to:
 60S ribosomal protein L32
 Buick L32 engine, a V6 engine introduced in 2004
 General Motors L32 engine, a V6 engine introduced in 1993
 , a destroyer of the Royal Navy
 , a sloop of the Royal Navy
 Mitochondrial ribosomal protein L32
 Nissan Altima (L32), a Japanese automobile
 NRO L-32, an American reconnaissance satellite